Ambodinonoka Rangalana is a rural municipality located in the Atsinanana region of eastern Madagascar.  It belongs to the Vatomandry District.

References

Populated places in Atsinanana